Mary Fallin (née Copeland; born December 9, 1954) is an American politician who served as the 27th governor of Oklahoma from 2011 to 2019. A member of the Republican Party, she was elected in 2010 and reelected in 2014. She is the first and so far only woman to be elected governor of Oklahoma. She was the first woman to represent Oklahoma in Congress since Alice Mary Robertson in 1920.

Beginning a career in politics, Fallin was elected to the Oklahoma House of Representatives in 1990. She served two terms in the Oklahoma House, representing a district in Oklahoma City, from 1990 to 1995. In 1994, Fallin was elected to serve as the 14th lieutenant governor of Oklahoma; being elected to a total of three terms, she served under two different governors from 1995 to 2007. After seven-term Republican incumbent Ernest Istook announced that he would retire from his seat to run for governor, Fallin declared her candidacy for Oklahoma's 5th congressional district, where she was elected to two terms in the U.S. House of Representatives, serving from 2007 to 2011. Fallin became the first woman elected to Congress from Oklahoma since 1920, when Alice Mary Robertson became Oklahoma's first (and the nation's second) woman to be elected to Congress.

Fallin ran for Governor of Oklahoma in 2010. She defeated three other opponents with 54% of the vote in the Republican primary, and defeated the Democratic nominee, Lieutenant Governor Jari Askins, with 60% of the vote in the general election. She won reelection in 2014, defeating Oklahoma state representative Joe Dorman. Term limits barred Fallin from seeking a third term to the governorship that year; fellow Republican Kevin Stitt was elected to succeed her.

Early life, education, and early career
Fallin was born Mary Copeland in Warrensburg, Missouri, the daughter of Mary Jo (née Duggan) and Joseph Newton Copeland. Her mother and father each served terms as mayor of Tecumseh, Oklahoma, where she was raised. They were both members of the Oklahoma Democratic Party. She was a Democrat until she was 21. That year she switched to the Republican Party of Oklahoma and became active with the Young Republicans. She graduated from Tecumseh High School and attended Oklahoma Baptist University, in Shawnee. Fallin holds a bachelor of science degree in human and environmental sciences, and family relations and child development from Oklahoma State University (1977). At Oklahoma State she joined the Kappa Alpha Theta sorority.

Government and Private Sector Employment
After college, Fallin worked for the Oklahoma Department of Tourism and Recreation, Oklahoma Employment Security Commission, and the Oklahoma Office of Personnel Management. In 1983, she went to the private sector as a hotel manager for Lexington Hotel and Suites, located at Richmond Square near Blackwelder and Northwest Expressway which was later demolished to make way for OnCue. She has also worked as marketing director for a Ski Lodge in Utah, and in Oklahoma was a commercial real estate broker.

Oklahoma House of Representatives

Elections
Fallin ran for the 85th district of the Oklahoma House of Representatives after incumbent Mike Hunter announced his retirement in December 1989. She won the Republican primary in August and the general election in November. In 1992, she won re-election to a second term unopposed.

Tenure
She represented Oklahoma City in the House, and authored 16 bills that became law. In 1992, Oklahoma became one of the first five states in the nation to enact anti-stalking legislation when Fallin authored and introduced HB 2291, which made it illegal to stalk or harass people.   Fallin was active with the conservative American Legislative Exchange Council (ALEC), and was recognized by ALEC as Legislator of the Year in 1993. Also that year she was named Guardian of Small Business by the National Federation of Independent Business. According to The Almanac of American Politics, she "championed victims' rights and health care reform."

Lieutenant Governor (1995–2007)

Elections
After two terms in the House, Fallin decided to run for Lieutenant Governor of Oklahoma. Ultimately she ran in three elections that year, all of which were against other women, and raised about $200,000. She faced two other candidates in the Republican primary. Terry Neese ranked first with 38% of the vote, but failed to reach the 50% threshold needed to win outright. Fallin ranked second with 36% of the vote, qualifying for the run-off election. She defeated Neese in the run-off primary election 53%–47%. She defeated Democrat Nance Diamond 50%–44%. She did well in the northwest region, the Oklahoma Panhandle, and her home Oklahoma County.

She won re-election to a second term in 1998, defeating Jack Morgan 68%–32%. She won all but nine counties, all of which were located in the far eastern part of the state. She won re-election to a third term in 2002, defeating Democratic State Representative Laura Boyd 57%–39%, dominating the eastern part of the state.

Tenure
In 1995, Fallin became the first woman and first Republican to be sworn in as lieutenant governor of Oklahoma, an office she would hold for 12 years.  As lieutenant governor, Fallin served on 10 boards and commissions. Early in her tenure, the Alfred P. Murrah Federal Building, located in Oklahoma City, was bombed, killing 168 people in what became the worst case of domestic terrorism in United States history; Fallin led a task force to rebuild the childcare center that was lost in the attack.  In 1997, she chaired the Fallin Commission on Workers' Compensation, which released a comprehensive reform plan to lower costs in the state's workers' compensation system.  Fallin promoted Project Homesafe, a national initiative of the National Shooting Sports Foundation, a firearms industry trade association, to distribute free cable gun locks to reduce the risk of accidental in-home shootings.

In her role as the president of the state senate, Fallin promoted legislation to adopt a right-to-work law prohibiting labor unions from requiring members to pay union dues as a condition of employment; Oklahoma ultimately passed a right-to-work law in 2001. With 12 years of service as Lieutenant Governor, Fallin was the state's third longest-serving Lieutenant Governor in Oklahoma history.

Leadership positions

In 1998, Fallin served as chairwoman of the National Lieutenant Governors Association.  In 1999, she served as chairwoman of the Republican Lieutenant Governors Association.  Fallin also served as the national Chairwoman of the Aerospace States Association.

U.S. House of Representatives (2007–2011)

Elections

2006

Fallin decided not to seek re-election to a fourth term as lieutenant governor. Instead, she decided to run in Oklahoma's 5th congressional district, after incumbent Republican congressman Ernest Istook decided to run for governor of Oklahoma. Fallin also considered running for governor and challenging incumbent Democrat Brad Henry, but decided against it given Henry's popularity as measured in polls at the time. Istook lost to Henry by a landslide of 33 percentage points.

The July 25 Republican primary for the 5th district had six candidates. Fallin received 35% of the vote. Oklahoma City Mayor Mick Cornett finished second with 24% of the vote. The contest between her and Cornett was largely financial. They had few differences on the issues, but Fallin had a big cash advantage. On August 22, 2006, she defeated Cornett in the run-off primary election, 63%–37%.

Fallin won the general election on November 7, defeating Democrat Paul David Hunter 60%–40%.

2008

Fallin easily won re-election in 2008, defeating Democrat Steve Perry 66%–34%.

Tenure

Fallin became the first woman elected to Congress from Oklahoma since 1920, when Alice Mary Robertson became Oklahoma's first (and the nation's second) woman to be elected to Congress. Fallin resigned her position as Lieutenant Governor on January 2, 2007 in order to be sworn into Congress on January 4, 2007. Lieutenant Governor-elect Jari Askins was appointed by Oklahoma Governor Brad Henry to fill the remaining days of Fallin's term.

The 5th district included  Oklahoma, Pottawatomie, and Seminole counties.

In June 2007, she passed her first bill: a revamping of federal grants for women's business centers. She joined a group of 38 Republicans who opposed an expansion of the State Children's Health Insurance Program (CHIP).

During the financial crisis of 2007–2008, Fallin voted for the 2008 Wall Street bailout. However, Fallin voted against the auto industry rescue plan of 2008.

Committee assignments
 House Committee on Armed Services
 House Committee on Small Business
 House Committee on Transportation and Infrastructure
 United States House Committee on Natural Resources

Caucus memberships
In addition to her committee assignments, she served on the Executive Committee of the National Republican Congressional Committee, Small Business Chairwoman on the Republican Policy Committee, and Vice Chairwoman of the Congressional Women's Caucus.

2010 gubernatorial election

In September 2009, Fallin and four other candidates had announced their intentions to run for governor to succeed Brad Henry. Along with Fallin they were:
 Former President of the Oklahoma Office Machine Dealers Association (OOMDA) Roger L. Jackson (R)
 Attorney General of Oklahoma Drew Edmondson (D)
 Lieutenant Governor of Oklahoma Jari Askins (D)
 State Senator Randy Brogdon (R)
 Oklahoma business owner Robert Hubbard (R)
Fallin won the Republican nomination with 136,460 votes, ahead of her nearest challenger, State Senator Randy Brogdon, who received 98,159 votes. Former Alaska governor and 2008 vice-presidential candidate Sarah Palin endorsed Fallin in the primary.   On November 2, 2010, Fallin defeated Democratic nominee Jari Askins 60% to 39% to become the first female governor of Oklahoma.

Governor of Oklahoma (2011–2019)

Transition, staff and advisors
In the election in which Fallin was elected governor, every statewide Republican official on the ballot was victorious, and for the first time in Oklahoma history, Republicans dominated all 11 statewide positions. Fallin began her transition by holding a joint press conference with outgoing governor Brad Henry.

Fallin named Devon Energy chairman and CEO Larry Nichols as the chairman of her transition team and outgoing Oklahoma Senate President pro tempore Glenn Coffee (R-Tulsa) as the Transition's Co-Chairman.  She also established her Governor's Taskforce on Economic Development to advise her on matters related to the economy. Members of that task force include BancFirst CEO David Rainbolt and former Walters Administration Secretary of Agriculture Gary Sherrer. Former Keating Administration Secretary of Energy Robert J. Sullivan, Jr. serves as the director of the Taskforce as the Special Advisor to the Governor on Economic Development.

Fallin appointed Gary Sherrer as Oklahoma Secretary of the Environment, a position he previously held under Democratic governor David Walters; Tulsa city auditor Preston Doerflinger as Oklahoma Secretary of Finance and Revenue and director of the Oklahoma Office of State Finance; and state health commissioner Terry Cline as Oklahoma Secretary of Health and Human Services.

Fallin appointed Dave Lopez Oklahoma Secretary of Commerce and Tourism and director of the Oklahoma Department of Commerce in 2011. Lopez left Fallin's cabinet in 2013, but returned in 2017, when Fallin appointed him secretary of state.

Fallin named Lieutenant Governor Todd Lamb to her cabinet as Small Business Advocate. In February 2017, however, Lamb resigned from the Small Business Advocate post, saying that he could not support Fallin's proposal to impose the sales tax to 164 different services that are currently not taxed. Lamb said that proposal would harm small businesses and families in the state; Fallin responded by saying she was disappointed in the resignation and that her proposals were necessary to address the $900 million "structural deficits of our budget."

Fallin's general counsel, Jennifer Chance, abruptly resigned in 2017, five months after becoming general counsel, amid a conflict-of-interest controversy. Chance had referred legal business involving Robert Bates, a reserve deputy convicted of manslaughter in the fatal shooting of Eric Harris in 2015, to her husband, a criminal defense attorney who was paid $25,000 to seek a governor's commutation of Bates's sentence. Fallin appointed former state senator James Williamson to replace Chance.

Public opinion
The state’s first female governor started with a strong approval rating but departed with an approval rating of 23.4 percent.

Criminal law

Lethal injection controversy

Under Fallin, Oklahoma has pushed for increased use of lethal injection as a mode of execution, while refusing to release details of the new chemical concoctions used in these executions following chemical company Hospira's decision to stop producing sodium thiopental, which had previously been widely used. Fallin pushed strongly for the execution of convicted murderer Clayton Lockett to proceed in spite of the lack of tested drugs to use for lethal injection. When the Oklahoma State Supreme Court granted a stay of execution, Fallin immediately overruled it, leading some political commentators to raise the possibility of a constitutional crisis surrounding the separation of powers. At the same time, a member of the Oklahoma legislature moved to impeach the seven justices on the Supreme Court who had granted the stay. Lockett's execution was attempted on April 29, 2014, but was abandoned when he could not be sedated and was left writhing in pain. Lockett died 43 minutes later of a heart attack.  Fallin appointed a member of her staff to lead the investigation into the botched execution. Robert Patton, her director of corrections, resigned, and despite an Oklahoma conflict of interest law, was hired as a deputy warden by GEO Group whose contract he had overseen. Oklahoma State Prison warden Anita Trammel also resigned during the investigation.<ref>Did corrections chief's new job violate state law?, Bartlesville Examiner-Enterprise, December 23, 2016. Retrieved 14 January 2016.</ref>

Criminal justice reform
In 2016, Fallin convened an Oklahoma Justice Reform Task Force to make various recommendations on criminal justice reform in Oklahoma, which has the second-highest incarceration rate among U.S. states. In 2017, Fallin praised a package of bills passed by the state House and state Senate; the bills, which passed unanimously or by broad margins, would, among other things, allow nonviolent offenders sentenced to life imprisonment to petition for a sentence modification after ten years in prison; expand diversion programs that steer convicted persons from prison to treatment and supervision; mandate "the creation of individualized plans for inmates to help them better reintegrate into society" after release from prison; and establish an oversight council to track the effectiveness of reform initiatives.Barbara Hoberock, Senate passes slate of criminal justice reform measures, Tulsa World (March 22, 2017).

In 2017, however, Fallin struggled to push further major criminal justice reform bills through the legislature. This package of bills, supported by Fallin and recommended by the Task Force, would lower sentences for nonviolent drug crimes, allow more elderly prisoners to be paroled, and expand diversion programs. The bills were bottled up in the House Judiciary-Criminal Justice and Corrections Committee under its chairman, state Representative Scott Biggs, which prompted Fallin to criticized Biggs.Randy Ellis, Oklahoma Gov. Fallin criticizes Biggs for holding up justice reform bills, The Oklahoman (May 25, 2017). In August 2017, Fallin was sued by inmates alleging unfair parole hearings and corruption from state lawmakers.

Anti-protest legislation
In 2017 Fallin signed legislation establishing fines of at least $10,000 for protesters who trespass on critical infrastructure sites (such as fossil fuel facilities), or $100,000 and a 10-year prison sentence for protesters who "tamper" with such facilities. The legislation also imposes fines of up to $1 million on organizations found to have conspired with trespassers.

Ten Commandments monument controversy

Fallin was a supporter of a controversial Ten Commandments monument that had been erected on the Oklahoma State Capitol grounds in 2012. In July 2015, the Oklahoma Supreme Court ruled, in a 7-2 vote, that the monument's presence on public land violated the Oklahoma Constitution, which prohibits the use of public property "for the benefit of any religious purpose." Fallin initially refused to follow the court order, expressing the view that the ruling was incorrect and that the state would petition for a rehearing of the case.Abby Phillips, Oklahoma's Ten Commandments statue isn't going anywhere, governor says, Washington Post (July 7, 2015).

The court's ruling was subsequently upheld, and in October 2015 the monument was quietly removed from Capitol grounds to a private property several blocks away. Fallin called for a state constitutional amendment to restore the monument to the Capitol grounds.Barbara Hoberock, Fallin urges lawmakers to act swiftly on Ten Commandments amendment: Governor seeks constitutional amendment, Tulsa World (October 7, 2015). The Legislature passed the resolution placing the question on the Oklahoma ballot, with voters to decide at the November 2016 election. The resolution was subsequently defeated.

2016 vice-presidential speculation
In a televised interview in April 2016, Fallin's name was mentioned by former South Carolina Lieutenant Governor André Bauer as a potential running mate for Donald Trump, should he become the Republican presidential nominee in the 2016 presidential election. Trump himself described Bauer's suggestion as "great advice" in a tweet shortly afterwards. Fallin later endorsed Trump on May 4, 2016.

In May 2016, the Republican National Committee announced that Fallin would serve as co-chairwoman to the 2016 Republican National Convention's Committee on Resolutions, known as the Platform Committee.

Fiscal policy

Over the course of her tenure as governor, Fallin has sought to eliminate Oklahoma's state income tax while expanding sales taxes.Gov. Fallin wants sales tax expansion to close budget hole, Associated Press (February 1, 2016).

Cutting Oklahoma's personal income tax, the state's largest source of tax revenue, has been a "top priority" for Fallin and Republican legislators. In the 2012 legislative session, legislation advocated by Fallin and allies to cut the top income tax from 5.25% to 4.8% while eliminating 33 tax credits failed, in part because the legislation would increase the tax burden on around one-quarter of Oklahoma taxpayers, particularly middle-class taxpayers with two or more children.

In 2016, Fallin ultimately secured a reduction in the state income tax from 5.25 percent to 5 percent, which would result in an annually loss of $147 million in revenue to the state when fully implemented. In the aftermath of a steep drop in oil and gas prices that hurt state revenue, the state Senate passed legislation to roll the tax cut back, which Fallin opposed. The budget revenue caused by the drop in state revenue forced a cut of 16.5% to Oklahoma public schools for the last several months of the 2016 fiscal year on top of a previous 3% reduction, and compelled some schools in rural Oklahoma to go to a four-day school week.Kylen Mills, Debate heats up over the impact of 4-day school week on kids, schools, KOKH (May 2, 2016).

In February 2016 at the opening of the Oklahoma Legislature's session, Fallin proposed $200 million in increased taxes to deal with an anticipated budget shortfall of at least $900 million for fiscal year 2017, which Fallin said was the largest budget hole in state history.  Fallin proposed expanding state sales and use taxes to services and items delivered electronically such as music sold online, neither of which are currently taxed in Oklahoma. Fallin also proposed eliminating some annual sales-tax exemptions and more than doubling the state cigarette tax, from $1.03 to $2.53 per pack. Fallin proposed reducing appropriations to most state agencies by 6 percent, with smaller cuts of 3 percent to certain core agencies.

The budget legislation ultimately signed into law by Fallin in June 2016 eliminated the refundable portion of the state earned income tax credit as well as the double deduction income tax credit; the budget also reduced some tax credits. The partial repeal of the state's earned income tax credit was supported by legislative Republicans, who wanted additional revenue for the state to close a shortfall, and opposed by legislative Democrats and the Oklahoma Policy Institute, who argued that it was wrong to eliminate a tax credit that helped working poor Oklahomans.Gene Perry, New bill would devastate a key tax credit for Oklahoma working families, Oklahoma Policy Institute (May 12, 2016). The budget cut most state services by 5%, with steeper cuts to higher education, which was cut 16%. (Corrections and healthcare funding remained steady.) In May 2016, Fallin also signed into law a measure requiring online retailers and consumers to collect sales taxes for goods purchased online.

In 2017, Fallin pushed to expand the state sales tax to 164 services that are not currently taxed, in order to raise hundreds of millions of dollars in state revenue. Fallin specifically proposed imposing sales tax on the top ten services by sales: residential utility services, as well as "cable TV services; repair and maintenance services; legal services; real estate agent services; plumbing and heating services; electrical and wiring services; oil field services; business services; and accounting services." Fallin's proposed tax increase would increase monthly residential utility costs by 4.5%. In return for imposing sales tax on these items, Fallin proposed the elimination of the state sales tax on groceries, although local sales tax for groceries would remain.

In May 2017, Fallin vetoed a bill to permit more high-interest payday loans in Oklahoma. The bill had strong support in the Republican-controlled state legislature but was opposed by a broad coalition of political and religious groups who opposed the bill as enabling predatory lending.Randy Ellis, Oklahoma Gov. Fallin vetoes payday loan bill, The Oklahoman (May 5, 2017). Fallin vetoed similar legislation four years earlier.

Abortion legislation

During her term as governor, Fallin has signed 20 anti-abortion measures into law. In April 2015, Fallin signed into law a measure banning a common second-trimester abortion procedure, dilation and evacuation, except when necessary to save the life of the woman. In May 2015, Fallin signed into law a measure that tripled the mandatory waiting period in Oklahoma for an abortion, extending it to 72 hours. The measure also included other anti-abortion provisions.

In May 2016, Fallin vetoed a bill passed by the Oklahoma State Legislature that would have made it a felony, punishable by up to three years in prison, to perform an abortion, except in instances to save the life of the mother. In a statement, Fallin's office said: "The bill is so ambiguous and so vague that doctors cannot be certain what medical circumstances would be considered 'necessary to preserve the life of the mother.'"

In December 2016, Fallin signed into law a bill to require all Oklahoma Department of Health-regulated entities, including restaurants, public buildings, hospitals, and small businesses,  to install anti-abortion signs in their public restrooms by January 2018. The bill appropriates no state funding for the signs, requiring businesses to pay the estimated cost (estimated to be $2.3 million).

LGBT issues
Fallin was criticized for bias after ordering state-owned National Guard facilities to deny spousal benefits (including the provision of identification cards that would allow them to access such benefits) to all same-sex couples.  Fallin took the position that such relationships were illegitimate under Oklahoma law.  Fallin later backed down after U.S. Secretary of Defense Chuck Hagel stated that Oklahoma would be in violation of federal law for refusing to recognize the relationships.

In 2018, Fallin signed legislation that would allow private adoption agencies to refuse to place children in homes if it "would violate the agency's written religious or moral convictions or policies." The legislation was opposed by LGBT rights groups, which said that the legislation would allow discrimination against LGBT couples seeking to adopt.

Guns
In 2014, Fallin vetoed a bill that would have required sheriffs and police chief to approve individuals' "applications for tax stamps for items such as silencers, suppressors, short-barreled rifles and shotguns, and automatic weapons." The Republican-controlled legislature overrode the veto.

In 2015, Fallin vetoed legislation that would have restricted businesses' ability to prohibit guns in parks, fairgrounds and recreational areas.

In 2018, Fallin vetoed legislation to authorize adults to publicly carry guns without permit or training, prompting the NRA to criticize her.Sean Murray, Oklahoma governor vetoes gun carry bill in defeat for NRA, Associated Press (May 12, 2018).

Climate change
Fallin is part of a group of Republican governors who have said that they will refuse to comply with Environmental Protection Agency regulations to reduce carbon emissions and combat climate change.Devin Henry, Oklahoma takes aim at climate plan, The Hill (April 30, 2015). In April 2015, Fallin issued an executive order prohibiting the Oklahoma Department of Environmental Quality and other state agencies from creating an emissions-reduction strategy under the Clean Power Plan, becoming the first governor to do so.

In a proclamation in September 2016, Fallin declared October 13, 2016 to be Oilfield Prayer Day, calling upon Christians to "thank God for the blessing created by the oil and natural gas industry and to seek His wisdom and ask for protection."Derek Hawkins, Oklahoma Gov. Mary Fallin says all faiths, not just Christians, should observe 'Oilfield Prayer Day', Washington Post (October 11, 2016). The proclamation attracted criticism because it was initially limited only to Christians. Following these objections, Fallin amended the proclamation to include people of "all faiths."

Local governments
In April 2014, Fallin signed into law S.B. 1023, which prohibits cities in Oklahoma from establishing citywide minimum wages or sick-leave requirements.  The legislation targeted Oklahoma City, where a local initiative sought to establish a citywide minimum wage higher than the current federal minimum wage.

In May 2015, Fallin signed into law a measure prohibiting Oklahoma local governments from enacting local bans on oil and gas drilling. The bill was a response to a vote in Denton, Texas, to bar hydraulic fracturing (fracking), although no Oklahoma local government had attempted to ban fracking. The bill passed the state House 64-32 and the Senate 33-13; the bill was opposed by the Oklahoma Municipal League.

Education
In late January 2011, following a heated Oklahoma State Board of Education meeting, Fallin proposed major changes to the Oklahoma State Department of Education's organization and structure. The controversy arose over the Board of Education rejecting three senior staff members of Oklahoma State Superintendent of Public Instruction Janet Barresi. Under Fallin's proposed changes, the Board would be stripped of its administrative powers and those powers would be transferred solely to the state superintendent, thus reducing the board to more of an advisory committee to the superintendent as opposed to a government body of the department.

Fallin was formerly a champion of the Common Core State Standards (which Oklahoma adopted in 2010), but in June 2014 signed a bill dropping the standards.Cory Turner, Common Core Repeal, The Day After, All Things Considered, NPR (December 30, 2014).

In April 2015, Fallin signed into law a measure that expanded charter schools statewide (a change from previous law, which allowed charter schools only in Tulsa and Oklahoma counties). The legislation required all expanding charter schools to receive approval from the local boards of education, and mandated that all charter schools be free and open like traditional public schools, thereby eliminating the prospect of charter schools picking and choosing students.

In an April 2018 interview, Fallin likened teachers who demanded raises to "a teenage kid that wants a better car" and claimed that antifa were involved in an Oklahoma teachers' strike. Fallin also criticized "outside" groups that protested with Oklahoma teachers at Oklahoma State Capitol, referring to the National Education Association and West Virginia teachers.

Relations with Native American tribes
During Fallin's term, the State of Oklahoma engaged in an extended legal battle with the Choctaw Nation and Chickasaw Nation over water rights in southeastern Oklahoma. In 2011, the tribes filed a federal lawsuit in the U.S. District Court for the Western District of Oklahoma. In 2016, after years of negotiations and court proceedings, the state and the tribes—represented by Fallin, Choctaw Nation Chief Gary Batton, and Chickasaw Nation Governor Bill Anoatubby—came to a settlement agreement, with a compact (which needs congressional approval) to govern when and how water can be transferred out of Sardis Lake.

In May 2015, Fallin signed a bill for a $25 million bond proposal to complete the Native American Cultural Center and Museum, a project already underway. The legislation also returned ownership of the property and museum to Oklahoma City.

In March 2017, Fallin approved of the Shawnee Tribe's plan to build a $25 million casino close to Guymon in the Oklahoma Panhandle.Gov. Fallin approves Shawnee Tribe's application for casino in Oklahoma Panhandle, KFOR-TV and K. Querry (March 7, 2017).

Medical marijuana
In the June 2018 primary election, Oklahoma voters approved State Question 788, a ballot measure that legalized the growth, possession, sale, and use of marijuana for medicinal purposes, and provided that physicians could broadly prescribe it for various conditions. During the campaign, Fallin opposed the measure, arguing that it would effectively legalize marijuana for recreational purposes, and indicated that if the measure passed, she would call a special session of the state legislature to set regulations on use.

On July 11, 2018, soon after the measure passed, Fallin signed stringent new emergency rules adopted by the Oklahoma Board of Health to prohibit the sale of marijuana in smokeable form and to require that a pharmacist be on-site at dispensaries during operating hours.Samantha Vicent, Gov. Mary Fallin urges board to rescind last-minute changes to medical marijuana emergency rules, Tulsa World (July 18, 2018). These regulations angered marijuana activists, drawing bipartisan opposition in the state and fueling renewed calls for a special session of the legislature. After state Attorney General Michael J. Hunter determined that the adoption of the two rules exceeded the statutory authority of the Board of Health, Fallin urged the board to rescind the rules. Fallin criticized proponents of State Question 788 for their support of a ballot measure with a 30-day timeframe for implementation, but said that "the state will carry out the responsibility of administering" the new marijuana regime.

Executive action
Executive orders
An executive order is a directive issued by the Governor that manages operations of the executive branch of the State government. Unless authorized by the Legislature, executive orders do not have the force of law but are binding upon the executive branch. All executive orders expire 90 days following the inauguration of the next Governor unless otherwise terminated or continued during that time by a subsequent executive order.

Honors
Fallin has been honored with numerous awards, including Women in Communications' Woman in the News Award, induction into the Oklahoma Women's Hall of Fame, Clarence E. Page Award, induction into the Oklahoma Aviation Hall of Fame, 1998 Woman of the Year in Government and 1993 Legislator of the Year. She is also the recipient of the 2014 Golden Padlock Award from Investigative Reporters and Editors for her "dedication to secrecy around execution records." The award is shared with former Missouri Governor Jay Nixon.

Personal life
Fallin married her first husband, Joseph Fallin, a dentist, in November 1984.  She filed for divorce in December 1998 following allegations of an affair with an Oklahoma Highway Patrol officer.  In November 2009, she married Wade Christensen, an Oklahoma City lawyer. They have a total of six children in their blended family, one of whom—model, makeup artist, and musician Christina Fallin—was described as "the most interesting governor's daughter in the country" by a 2014 Washington Post'' article.

Election history
August 23, 1994, Lieutenant Governor of Oklahoma Republican primary results

September 20, 1994, Lieutenant Governor of Oklahoma Republican primary runoff results

November 8, 1994, Lieutenant Governor of Oklahoma election results

August 27, 2002, Lieutenant Governor of Oklahoma Republican primary results

June 24, 2014, Governor of Oklahoma Republican primary results

See also
 Government of Oklahoma
 53rd Oklahoma Legislature
 54th Oklahoma Legislature
 Governor's Council on Physical Fitness and Sports
 List of female governors in the United States
 List of female lieutenant governors in the United States
 Women in the United States House of Representatives

References

External links

 Governor Mary Fallin official Oklahoma government site
 Mary Fallin for Governor
 Mary Fallin on VP
 Mary Fallin on Abortion
 
 Women of the Oklahoma Legislature Oral History Project -- OSU Library
U.S. Congress (2007–2011)
 
 

|-

|-

|-

|-

|-

|-

|-

1954 births
21st-century American politicians
21st-century American women politicians
American Christians
American real estate businesspeople
American women civil servants
Female members of the United States House of Representatives
Republican Party governors of Oklahoma
Lieutenant Governors of Oklahoma
Living people
Republican Party members of the Oklahoma House of Representatives
Oklahoma Baptist University alumni
Oklahoma State University alumni
Politicians from Oklahoma City
People from Pottawatomie County, Oklahoma
People from Warrensburg, Missouri
Republican Party members of the United States House of Representatives from Oklahoma
University of Central Oklahoma alumni
Women in Oklahoma politics
Women state governors of the United States
Women state legislators in Oklahoma